KTA Super Stores is an American company with its headquarters in Hilo, Hawaii, United States, and has the largest network of supermarkets on the Big Island.

In General
KTA Super Stores' history goes back to 1916 when Koichi and Taniyo Taniguchi, with their associates, established a small food store in Hilo, Hawaii. A hundred years after this start, it grew to have a network of six supermarkets on the Big Island.

In 1941, KTA opened a branch store in downtown Hilo. As the original store perished in the tsunami of the 1946 Aleutian Islands earthquake, they continued their business in this downtown store. In 1953, they expanded it to become a supermarket.

KTA now has a chain of six supermarkets:
 Hilo downtown store (opened 1941)
 Kailua Kona store (1959) - moved to the current location in 1975
 Puainako, Hilo, store (1966)
 Keauhou store (1984)
 Waimea store (1989)
 Waikoloa Village store (1990)
 Kealakekua, Hawaii Express store (2018)

In its hundred-year history, KTA always responded to its customers of the community each store serves, such as providing with the Asian food corner.

KTA's competitors are the local Hawaiian supermarkets, such as Foodland Hawaii and Sack 'n Save, and the nationwide supermarkets, such as Safeway, Costco, Walmart etc.

See also
 Foodland Hawaii

References

External links
 （KTA Super Stores）

Supermarkets of the United States
Retail companies based in Hawaii
1916 establishments in Hawaii
Retail companies established in 1916